Made for Love is a 2017 novel by American writer Alissa Nutting.

Reception
The book received mostly positive reviews.

Annalisa Quin, writing for NPR, gave the novel a mixed review, saying that the book's "....ideas are never more interesting than in their first iterations."

HBO Series
An HBO Max series based on the book premiered on April 1, 2021.

References

2017 American novels
Novels set in Florida
Ecco Press books